Richard C. Zoellner (June 30, 1908 - March 3, 2003) was an American abstract painter, muralist, printmaker and art educator. During the New Deal, he was commissioned murals in the post offices of Cleveland, Georgetown, Hamilton, Medina, and Portsmouth in Ohio, as well as Mannington, West Virginia. He had a studio in Cincinnati from 1933 to 1942, and he taught at the University of Alabama from 1945 to 1978.

References

1908 births
2003 deaths
People from Portsmouth, Ohio
People from Tuscaloosa, Alabama
American abstract artists
American muralists
American printmakers
Artists from Cincinnati
Painters from Ohio
Painters from Alabama
University of Alabama faculty
20th-century American painters
20th-century American male artists